Branthwaite Hall is pele tower in Cumbria, England, considered by historian Anthony Emery to be "one of the best-preserved early houses in Cumbria".

History
Branthwaite Hall was built near the village of Branthwaite and the town of Cockermouth in the mid-15th century by the Skelton family, who acquired the surrounding manor from the Branthwaites by marriage. The new building was constructed from rubble stone with a single tower with a parapet and a spiral-stair turret, with an adjacent hall. The hall was 60 feet long and 42 wide (18 metres by 13 metres), but was largely remodelled in 1604; the new hall is a single space, whereas it was probably originally subdivided, and additional windows were added. Subsequent work was conducted in the 1670s to give the property a grander appearance. The Skeltons held the hall until 1757.

It was designated as a Grade I listed building in 1967.

Today
Branthwaite Hall was restored between 1985 and 1986 by the National Coal Board, which converted the property into offices. It is considered by historian Anthony Emery to be "one of the best-preserved early houses in Cumbria".

See also
Castles in Great Britain and Ireland
List of castles in England

References

Bibliography
Emery, Anthony. (1996) Greater Medieval Houses of England and Wales, 1300–1500: Northern England. Cambridge: Cambridge University Press. .
Pettifer, Adrian. (2002) English Castles: a Guide by Counties. Woodbridge, UK: Boydell Press. .

Houses completed in the 15th century
Towers completed in the 15th century
Peel towers in Cumbria
Grade I listed buildings in Cumbria
Dean, Cumbria